Tanya may refer to:

People
 Tanya (name), a feminine given name

Film
 Tanya (1940 film), a Soviet musical comedy by Grigori Aleksandrov
 Tanya (1976 film), a low-budget American comedy

Music
 "Tanya", a composition by Donald Byrd, on Dexter Gordon's  album One Flight Up
 Tanya (album), a 2002 album by Tanya Tucker

Other uses
 2127 Tanya, an asteroid
 Hurricane Tanya, a storm in the 1995 Atlantic hurricane season
 Tanya (horse) (1902–1929), the winner of the 1905 Belmont Stakes horse race
 Tanya (Judaism),an early work of Hasidic philosophy by Rabbi Shneur Zalman of Liadi

See also 
 Tania (disambiguation)
 Tanja (disambiguation)
 Tonia (disambiguation)
 Tonya (disambiguation)